The men's 4 × 400 metres relay was the longer of the two men's relays on the Athletics at the 1964 Summer Olympics program in Tokyo.  It was held on 20 October and 21 October 1964.  20 teams, for a total of 80 athletes, from 20 nations entered, with 3 teams of 4 not starting in the first round.  The first round was held on 20 October with the final on 21 October.

The final of the 4×400 relay was the last event on the athletics schedule to begin, though the marathon was still in progress when the 4×400 finished.

Results

First round

The top two teams in each of the 3 heats as well as the two fastest remaining teams advanced.

First round, heat 1

First round, heat 2

First round, heat 3

Final

Carr moved from initial position to anchor for the United States team as they set a new world record, followed closely by Great Britain and Northern Ireland as well as Trinidad and Tobago.  All three teams were under the old world record time.

France also shuffled their lineup, moving Nelzy to third from first.

References

Athletics at the 1964 Summer Olympics
Relay foot races at the Olympics
Men's events at the 1964 Summer Olympics